Luis Rafael Garcia (born May 20, 1975 in San Francisco de Macorís, Dominican Republic) is a retired Major League Baseball shortstop. He played during one season at the major league level for the Detroit Tigers. He was signed by the Tigers as an amateur free agent in 1993. Garcia played his first professional season (in American baseball) with their Rookie league Bristol Tigers in 1993, and split his last season with the Triple-A teams of the Baltimore Orioles (Rochester Red Wings) and Pittsburgh Pirates (Nashville Sounds) in 2002.

Garcia's American-born son, also named Luis, signed with the Washington Nationals as an amateur free agent out of the Dominican Republic in 2016.

References
"Luis Garcia Statistics". The Baseball Cube. 14 January 2008.
"Luis Garcia Statistics". Baseball-Reference. 14 January 2008.

1975 births
Living people
Bristol Tigers players
Detroit Tigers players
Dominican Republic expatriate baseball players in the United States
Jacksonville Suns players
Jamestown Jammers players
Lakeland Tigers players

Major League Baseball players from the Dominican Republic
Major League Baseball shortstops
Memphis Redbirds players
Nashville Sounds players
Toledo Mud Hens players